Bhuvanagiri Punnaiah (born 12 May 2003) is an Indian cricketer. He made his first-class debut on 24 February 2022, for Hyderabad against Bengal in the 2021–22 Ranji Trophy. He made his T20 debut on 11 October 2022, for Hyderabad against Punjab in the 2022–23 Syed Mushtaq Ali Trophy. He made his List A debut on 12 November 2022, for Hyderabad against Himachal Pradesh in the 2022–23 Vijay Hazare Trophy.

References

External links
 

2003 births
Living people
Indian cricketers
Hyderabad cricketers
Place of birth missing (living people)